Cosmin Văsîie (born 16 November 1976) is a Romanian former footballer who played as a full back. Văsîie started his career in his hometown at IS Câmpia Turzii, then played for Universitatea Cluj, CFR Cluj, Ceahlăul Piatra Neamț and UTA Arad among others. With CFR Cluj he had the best results, succeeding in a Liga I promotion and a participation in the 2005 UEFA Intertoto Cup, where he played in 5 matches as the railwaymen reached the final.

Honours
Universitatea Cluj
Divizia C: 2000–01
CFR Cluj
Liga II: 2003–04
UEFA Intertoto Cup runner-up: 2005

Notes

References

External links
 
 

1976 births
Living people
People from Câmpia Turzii
Romanian footballers
Association football defenders
Liga I players
Liga II players
Liga III players
FC Universitatea Cluj players
CFR Cluj players
CSM Ceahlăul Piatra Neamț players
FC UTA Arad players
ACS Sticla Arieșul Turda players
FC Unirea Dej players
CSM Câmpia Turzii players